Baldwin VI ( 1030 – 17 July 1070), also known as Baldwin the Good, was Count of Hainaut from 1051 to 1070 (as Baldwin I) and Count of Flanders from 1067 to 1070.

Baldwin was the eldest son of Baldwin V of Flanders and Adela, a daughter of King Robert II of France and Constance of Arles. His father arranged his marriage, under threat of arms, to Richilde, the widow of Herman of Mons and heir of Hainaut. As Hainaut was a part of the Holy Roman Empire this enraged Emperor Henry III, who had not been consulted, causing him to wage war on the two Baldwins but was not successful. Between 1050 and 1054 Count Lambert II of Lens fought alongside the Baldwins against Henry III finding that this alliance best protected his interests.

Baldwin VI died on 17 July 1070. Baldwin had constructed the church of St. Peter's of Hasnon, placed monks there and designated it as his burial place. His early death left Flanders and Hainaut in the hands of his young son, Arnulf III, with Richilde as regent. Arnulf III was killed at the Battle of Cassel in 1071. Baldwin VI's younger son, Count Baldwin II of Hainaut, could not claim Flanders from Baldwin VI's brother, Robert I.

Notes

References

See also

Counts of Flanders family tree
Counts of Hainaut family tree

1030s births
1070 deaths
Year of birth uncertain
House of Flanders
Baldwin 6
Baldwin 1
Counts of Mons